1930 Myanmar earthquake may refer to: 
1930 Bago earthquake
1930 Irrawaddy earthquake – Damaging earthquake on July 18; 50 people killed
1930 Pyu earthquake